Archduke Stephen Francis Victor (14 September 1817 – 19 February 1867) was a member of the House of Habsburg-Lorraine and the last Palatine of Hungary, serving from 1847 to 1848.

Biography
He was the son of Archduke Joseph, Palatine of Hungary and Hermine of Anhalt-Bernburg-Schaumburg-Hoym. His
mother died shortly after giving birth to him and his twin sister, Archduchess Hermine of Austria.
He was brought up by his stepmother, Maria Dorothea of Württemberg.

He spent much of his childhood in Buda and at the family estate in Alcsút and received an excellent education. He was mainly interested in Political Science, which he also studied later in Vienna.

Career
From 1839 until 1841, he was a member of the imperial court at Vienna. In 1841, he travelled through the different countries of the monarchy, the Kingdom of Bohemia, the Kingdom of Lombardy–Venetia, the Tyrol, the Kingdom of Piedmont-Sardinia, the Papal States, Modena and Tuscany. In 1843, he gained the rank of lieutenant field marshal in the service of the Austrian Army and Emperor Ferdinand I of Austria appointed him governor of Bohemia. He stayed in that capacity until, in January 1847, his father died. Stephen succeeded him as Palatine of Hungary on 12 November 1847, but resigned in September 1848 as a result of the Hungarian Revolution.

Archduke Stephan died in 1867, unmarried and without issue.

Honours
He received the following orders and decorations:

Ancestry

References 

 Roberts, Gary Boyd, Notable Kin Volume Two, published in cooperation with the New England Historic and Genealogical Society, Boston, Massachusetts, by Carl Boyer, 3rd, Santa Clarita, California, 1999, volume 2, p. 220.

House of Habsburg-Lorraine
Austrian princes
Hungarian people of Austrian descent
People from Buda
1817 births
1867 deaths
Burials at Palatinal Crypt
Palatines of Hungary
Knights of the Golden Fleece of Austria
Grand Crosses of the Order of Saint Stephen of Hungary
Recipients of the Order of St. Anna, 1st class
Recipients of the Order of the White Eagle (Russia)